Hathor 20 - Coptic Calendar - Hathor 22

The twenty-first day of the Coptic month of Hathor, the third month of the Coptic year. On a common year, this day corresponds to November 17, of the Julian Calendar, and November 30, of the Gregorian Calendar. This day falls in the Coptic season of Peret, the season of emergence. This day falls in the Nativity Fast.

Commemorations

Feasts 

 Monthly commemoration of the Virgin Mary, the Theotokos

Saints 

 The martyrdom of Saint Alphaeus, Saint Zacchaeus, Saint Romanos, and Saint John 
 The martyrdom of Saint Thomas, Saint Victor, and Saint Isaac of Al-Ashmunin 
 The departure of Pope Cosma II, the fifty-fourth Patriarch of the See of Saint Mark 
 The departure of Saint Gregory the Wonderworker
 The departure of Saint John El-Tabyese in Assiut Mountain

Other commemorations 

 The relocation of the Body of Saint John Kama to the Monastery of the Syrians

References 

Days of the Coptic calendar